Land Of The Blind (stylized as _land of the blind) is a 2014 EP by American synthpop band Information Society.

Track listing
 "Land of the Blind" (Album Version)
 "Land of the Blind" (Marcos Carnaval & Paulo Jevaux Club Mix)
 "Land of the Blind" (Aesthetic Perfection Mix)
 "Land of the Blind" (Whiteqube Mix)
 "Land of the Blind" (Inertia Mix)
 "Me and My Rhythm Box"

2014 EPs